The Watchet Harbour Lighthouse is a marine navigational aid marking the entrance to a Marina within the  town of Watchet, in Somerset, England.

History

In the 1850s the West Somerset Mineral Railway was nearing completion. Parts of the harbour had fallen into disrepair, and boats were beached and loaded direct from carts brought onto the foreshore. It was recognised that improvements were needed for the sake of the prosperity of the town and the export of iron ore from ironstone mines in the Brendon Hills to Newport and thence to Ebbw Vale for smelting. The Watchet Harbour Act was passed in 1857, placing it under the control of Commissioners; they built a new east pier and rebuilt the west pier; the work was finished in 1862, and 500 ton vessels could enter the harbour. The west pier on which the lighthouse stands was constructed in 1860, at the same time as the current east pier, by Hennets of Bridgwater, and rebuilt in 1905.

Tenders for the new lighthouse at the end of the harbour wall were placed in 1860. Three bids were received. The design by Isambard Kingdom Brunel was rejected in favour of one by James Abernethy. This was built by Hennet, Spinks and Else of Bridgwater for £75. The cast iron structure was topped with an oil lamp.

In September 2012, Princess Anne unveiled a plaque to commemorate the 150th anniversary of the lighthouse.

Structure and operation

The lighthouse is a harbour navigation mark and does not emit a flashing light associated with traditional lighthouses. Instead it displays a fixed green luminaire marking the starboard (right hand side) approach to the marina.

See also

 List of lighthouses in England

References

External links

Watchet Museum

Lighthouses completed in 1862
Lighthouses in Somerset
1862 establishments in England
Watchet